Tan Sri Murad bin Ahmad (born 24 July 1921) was the 4th Commissioner General of Prison. He retired in 1977, succeeded by Ibrahim Mohamed.

Honour

Honour of Malaysia
  : 
 Commander of the Order of Loyalty to the Crown of Malaysia (P.S.M.) - Tan Sri (1977)

References

|-

1921 births
Possibly living people
Commanders of the Order of Loyalty to the Crown of Malaysia
Malaysian Muslims
Malaysian people of Malay descent
Malaysian prison administrators
People from Kedah